Işık Kaan Arslan (born 28 January 2001) is a Turkish professional footballer who plays as a centre-back for TFF Second League club Sarıyer on loan from Galatasaray.

Professional career

Galatasaray
A youth product of Galatasaray since 2012, Arslan signed his first professional contract with the club on 23 August 2019. He made his professional debut with Galatasaray in a 1-0 Süper Lig loss to Giresunspor on 8 January 2022, where he was subbed off in the 18th minute due to an injury.

Ergene Velimeşe (loan)
He began his senior career on loan with Ergene Velimeşe in the TFF Second League for the 2020–21 season.

Sarıyer (loan)
On 17 August 2022, Galatasaray was leased to the TFF Second League team Sarıyer for 1 year.

International career
Arslan is a youth international for Turkey, having represented the Turkey U16s, U17s, U18, and U19s.

References

External links
 
 Galatasaray Profile

2001 births
People from Bahçelievler, Istanbul
Footballers from Istanbul
Living people
Turkish footballers
Turkey youth international footballers
Association football defenders
Galatasaray S.K. footballers
Sarıyer S.K. footballers
Süper Lig players
TFF Second League players